Lynn Grove is an unincorporated community in Calloway County, Kentucky, United States.

History
Lilburn Linn establish a post office on the site in 1873 known as Linn Grove, Kentucky, but it closed in 1874.  In 1886 another post office was opened by Leon Blythe and it was known as Leonville, Kentucky.  On April 6, 1892, the name was changed to Lynn Grove.  It is thought a clerical error at the U.S. Post Office is why the spelling is different from the original name.

References

Unincorporated communities in Calloway County, Kentucky
Unincorporated communities in Kentucky